Francesco Vitelli (1586–1646) was a Roman Catholic ecclesiastic in the papal service.

Vitelli was born in  Città di Castello.  He was made titular archbishop of Thessalonica (16 August 1632), then successively transferred to Terni (1634) and to Urbino (1636) and appointed papal nuncio to the Republic of Venice. In 1643 Pope Urban VIII Barberini appointed him Governor of Rome, an honorary position that his absence as bishop of Urbino disabled him from taking up. He was a correspondent of the papal diplomat Guido Bentivoglio, who addressed to him his Relationi concerning Flanders, 1633.

Francesco Vitelli was of the line of Vitelli who had been rich merchants of Città di Castello, who made themselves masters of the town in the early fourteenth century, after civic confrontations with the rival Guelfucci of Brancaleone, and henceforward wielded political and military influence disproportionate to their small territory.

Notes

External links and additional sources
 (for Chronology of Bishops (for Chronology of Bishops) 
 (for Chronology of Bishops (for Chronology of Bishops) 
 (for Chronology of Bishops (for Chronology of Bishops) 
 (for Chronology of Bishops (for Chronology of Bishops) 

1586 births
1646 deaths
People from Città di Castello
17th-century Italian Roman Catholic archbishops
Francesco
Apostolic Nuncios to the Republic of Venice